Rose Tattoo is a 2011 album by Tiffany, her eighth studio album, and first full country record. Although her fourth album Dreams Never Die was influenced by the genre, Rose Tattoo represents Tiffany coming full circle, returning to her original genre before singing in malls made her a household name in pop music in the 1980s. The singer has described the sound of this new album as “Bonnie Raitt with a Stevie Ray Vaughan vibe.”  The album's release was celebrated with a release party in Nashville, Tennessee on February 25, 2011.

Track listing 
"Feel The Music" (Tiffany, Julie Forester, Dee Briggs)
"Crazy Girls", duet with Lindsay Lawler (Tiffany, Chris Roberts, Lindsay Lawler)
"He's All Man" (Tiffany, Tommy Wright)
"He Won't Miss Me" (Tiffany, Diana Draeger)
"All Over You" (Tiffany, Lorna Flowers)
"Just Love Me" (Tiffany, Chris Roberts)
"Love You Good" (Tommy Wright)
"Just That Girl" (Tiffany, Chris Roberts, Lindsay Lawler)

References 

2011 albums
Tiffany Darwish albums